Park Road 12 (PR 12) is a short Park Road located in Washington County, in the Gulf Coast region of the U.S. state of Texas. The highway was designated in 1939, and was shortened in 1970. The designation originally contained all roads within the park.

Route description

PR 12 begins at an at-grade intersection with FM 1155 just outside the border of the State Historic Site. The highway begins as a two-lane, paved road. The road proceeds eastward for a short distance before bending northeastward. The roadway continues northeast through dense trees before reaching its northern terminus, an at-grade intersection with a small park road.

History
Park Road 12 was first designated on September 26, 1939, as a redesignation of State Highway 229. The highway began at State Highway 90, and included all drives in Old Washington State Park, as the park was known at that time. On February 5, 1954, SH 90 was rerouted off of the road on the north end of PR 12, and the old route of SH 90 that intersected PR 12 was redesignated as FM 912 (SH 105 replaced this section of SH 90 on February 28, 1973). On March 5, 1963, FM 1155 extended north replacing the section of FM 912 at the north end of PR 12, meaning the north end was at FM 1155. On October 2, 1970, the Texas Highway Commission passed an order to remove most of the roads in the park road the PR 12 designation.

Major junctions

References

0012
Transportation in Washington County, Texas